Antonio Esteban is a Dominican windsurfer. He competed in the Windglider event at the 1984 Summer Olympics.

References

External links
 
 

Year of birth missing (living people)
Living people
Dominican Republic windsurfers
Dominican Republic male sailors (sport)
Olympic sailors of the Dominican Republic
Sailors at the 1984 Summer Olympics – Windglider
Place of birth missing (living people)